Planetoid may refer to:

A minor planet
A dwarf planet
An asteroid
Planetoid (comics)
Planetoids (video game)
Planetoid 127, a novel by Edgar Wallace published in 1929